Norway competed at the 2012 Summer Olympics in London, from 27 July to 12 August 2012. This was the nation's twenty-fourth appearance at the Summer Olympics; Norway did not take part in the 1904 Summer Olympics in St. Louis and the 1980 Summer Olympics in Moscow, due to the country's support for the United States boycott. The Norwegian Olympic and Paralympic Committee and Confederation of Sports sent a total of 66 athletes to the Games, 34 men and 32 women, to compete in 14 sports. Women's handball was the only team-based sport in which Norway was represented in these Olympic games. There was only a single competitor in badminton, mountain biking, diving, equestrian dressage, fencing and wrestling.

The Norwegian team featured past Olympic champions, three of them defending (javelin thrower Andreas Thorkildsen, single sculls rower Olaf Tufte, who competed at his fifth Olympics, and the women's national handball team, led by Gøril Snorroeggen). Archer Bård Nesteng made his Olympic comeback in London after a twelve-year absence. Other notable Norwegian athletes featured Gambian-born sprinter Jaysuma Saidy Ndure, who finished fourth in the world championships, breaststroke swimmer Sara Nordenstam, who previously won bronze in Beijing, and sprint kayaker Mira Verås Larsen, who was the nation's flag bearer at the opening ceremony.

Norway left London with a total of 4 medals (2 gold, 1 silver, and 1 bronze), the lowest haul since Los Angeles. Among the nation's medalists were Eirik Verås Larsen, who recaptured his gold medal from Athens in men's sprint kayaking, and Bartosz Piasecki, who won Norway's first ever Olympic medal in fencing. The women's national handball team managed to defend its Olympic title from Beijing, after beating Montenegro in the final. Several Norwegian athletes, however, narrowly missed out of the medal standings, including defending champions Thorklidsen and Tufte, and middle-distance runner Henrik Ingebrigtsen.

Medalists

Archery

Norway has qualified one archer for the men's individual event.

Athletics

Men
Track & road events

Field events

Women
Track & road events

Field events

Combined events – Heptathlon

Badminton

Canoeing

Sprint
Norway qualified boats for the following events:

Qualification Legend: FA = Qualify to final (medal); FB = Qualify to final B (non-medal)

Cycling

Road

Mountain biking

Diving

Men

Equestrian

Dressage

Fencing

Norway has qualified 1 fencer.

Men

Handball

Norway women's handball team will participate in the Olympic Games as European Champions, World Champions, and as defending Olympic Champions.

 Women's team event – 1 team of 14 players

Women's tournament

Group play

Quarter-final

Semi-final

Final

Final rank

Rowing

Norway has so far qualified boats for the following events

Men

Qualification Legend: FA=Final A (medal); FB=Final B (non-medal); FC=Final C (non-medal); FD=Final D (non-medal); FE=Final E (non-medal); FF=Final F (non-medal); SA/B=Semifinals A/B; SC/D=Semifinals C/D; SE/F=Semifinals E/F; QF=Quarterfinals; R=Repechage

Sailing

Norway has qualified 1 boat for each of the following events

Men

Women

M = Medal race; EL = Eliminated – did not advance into the medal race;

Shooting

The following quota places have been qualified for the Norwegian shooting squad at the Games;

Men

Women

Swimming

Norwegian swimmers have so far achieved qualifying standards in the following events (up to a maximum of 2 swimmers in each event at the Olympic Qualifying Time (OQT), and potentially 1 at the Olympic Selection Time (OST)):

Men

Women

Volleyball

Beach

The men's team qualified after winning the CEV Continental Beach Volleyball Cup.

Wrestling

Norway has qualified one quota.

Men's Greco-Roman

References

Nations at the 2012 Summer Olympics
2012
Summer Olympics